Vildanden may refer to:
 Vildanden (airline), a Norwegian airline.
 Vildanden (The Wild Duck), a play by Henrik Ibsen.